Strategic Petroleum Reserve may refer to:

 Strategic Petroleum Reserve (China)
 Strategic Petroleum Reserve (India)
 Strategic Petroleum Reserve (United States)

See also
 Global strategic petroleum reserves